Charles Woodruff may refer to:

Charles Woodruff (archer) (1846–1927), American Olympic archer
Charles Armijo Woodruff (1884–1945), 11th Governor of American Samoa
Charles Woodruff (general) (1845-1920)
Charlie Woodruff (1884–1943), English footballer

See also
Charles Woodruff House (disambiguation) two National Register of Historic Places locations